The 1942 New Mexico gubernatorial election took place on November 3, 1942, in order to elect the Governor of New Mexico. Incumbent Democrat John E. Miles was term-limited, and could not run for reelection to a third consecutive term. Former U.S. Representative John J. Dempsey won the open seat.

General election

Results

References

gubernatorial
1942
New Mexico
November 1942 events